Çan is a town in Çanakkale Province in the Marmara region of Turkey. It is the seat of Çan District. Its population is 30,970 (2021).

References

External links
 Road map of Çan and environs
 Various images of Çan, Çanakkale

Populated places in Çanakkale Province
Çan District
Towns in Turkey